Mauvais may refer to:

People with the surname
 Léon Mauvais (1902-1980), French trade unionist and senator of France from the Seine
 Victor Mauvais (1809-1854), French politician

Geography 
 Mauvaise River, a tributary of the Bras du Nord in Saint-Raymond, Quebec, Canada

See also

 Mauvais noir (disambiguation), a name for a few varieties of wine grapes